Mai Shaoyan (born January 19, 1979, in Nanhai, Foshan, Guangdong) is a female Chinese field hockey player who competed at the 2004 Summer Olympics.

She finished fourth with the Chinese team in the women's competition. She played all six matches.

External links
 
profile

1979 births
Living people
Chinese female field hockey players
Field hockey players at the 2004 Summer Olympics
Olympic field hockey players of China
People from Nanhai District
Asian Games medalists in field hockey
Sportspeople from Guangdong
Field hockey players at the 2006 Asian Games
Asian Games gold medalists for China
Medalists at the 2006 Asian Games